Govind Nanda (born February 17, 2001) is an American tennis player. He has a career-high singles ranking of 372 achieved on 22, August 2022, and a career-high doubles ranking of 497 achieved on August 22, 2022.

Personal life
Nanda is of Indian heritage. The son of Meena and Rajesh Nanda, he has a sister sister called Shyamlee. He grew up in Redlands, California before moving to Cerritos, California to be nearer his training facilities at the USTA centre in Carson. He and his sister started playing tennis at Clement Middle School in Redlands. Nanda attended Laurel Springs School in Ojai, California, before attending University of California, Los Angeles.

Career
Nanda reached the final of the Wimbledon boys doubles in 2019 losing to Jonáš Forejtek and Jiří Lehečka alongside his partner Liam Draxl.

Nanda was given a wildcard into the 2022 US Open men's doubles alongside his partner Brandon Holt.

Junior Grand Slam finals

Doubles: 1 (1 runner-up)

Explanatory notes

References

External links

2001 births
Living people
American male tennis players
Tennis people from California
Sportspeople from San Bernardino County, California
People from Loma Linda, California
American sportspeople of Indian descent
Indian-American tennis players
UCLA Bruins men's tennis players